Comstock's Bridge, also known as the Comstock Covered Bridge, is a covered bridge located in East Hampton, Connecticut, spanning the Salmon River, Built in 1840, it is one of only three historical covered bridges in the state.  It is open to pedestrian traffic in a small park off Comstock Bridge Road.  The bridge was listed on the National Register of Historic Places on January 1, 1976.

Description and history

Comstock's Bridge is located in southeastern East Hampton, near the junction of Comstock Bridge Road and Colchester Avenue (Connecticut Route 16). That span is covered by a gabled roof and sheathed in vertical board siding. Gates at either end of the bridge limit access to pedestrians. A secondary span,  in length, connects the bridge to the eastern shore. This span is uncovered; its trusses are sheathed in vertical siding with peaked caps. The bridge abutments are a combination of unmortared rubblestone and cut granite.

The bridge was built in 1840.  The bridge suffered major damage in the 1920s when a truck crashed through the floor.  It underwent major restoration work in the 1930s by a Civilian Conservation Corps crew, which replaced some bridge materials with parts in part recycled from old buildings, and added the gates at either end.  It is now closed to traffic, and is accessible from a small public park.

See also
List of bridges on the National Register of Historic Places in Connecticut
List of covered bridges in Connecticut
National Register of Historic Places listings in Middlesex County, Connecticut

References

External links

Connecticut's Historic Highway Bridges
Comstock Bridge 

Covered bridges on the National Register of Historic Places in Connecticut
Bridges completed in 1840
East Hampton, Connecticut
Bridges in Middlesex County, Connecticut
Tourist attractions in Middlesex County, Connecticut
National Register of Historic Places in Middlesex County, Connecticut
Road bridges on the National Register of Historic Places in Connecticut
Wooden bridges in Connecticut
Howe truss bridges in the United States